Tom Cheesman (born 1961 in Liverpool) is a Reader in German at Swansea University, literary critic and literary translator.

Tom is Principal Investigator on the collaborative, "Version Variation Visualisation" project. which investigates digital humanities approaches to analysing re-translations. His Case Study on Translations of Shakespeare's Othello investigates by advanced technology, how and why different translations of the same original text often differ significantly from each other. At this, initial stage, the project will concentrate its investigations on works of William Shakespeare.

Cheesman grew up in Durham, temporarily lived in Germany and France and now lives in Swansea, Wales.

The doctor of philology has numerous contributions (books and articles in journals) published in particular in the field of intercultural literature and has also published books himself. He has published in German.

Tom was the Principal Researcher on the "Axial Writing Project" (1998–2002), part of the ESRC Transnational Communities Research Programme, and co-established non-profit "Hafan Books" in 2003, to publish literary texts by refugees in Wales. Tom is currently (2014) the treasurer of Swansea Bay Asylum Seekers Support Group.

Crowd sourcing Othello and other works 
In 2013, Tom Cheesman, who is also a Wikipedia editor, started to crowd source translations to top-up his research into translations of Othello together with Dr Robert Laramee and Dr Jonathan Hope. On Wikimedia UK's Water Cooler describes his www.delightedbeauty.org project as a self-made Google site which displays around 180 versions, in over 30 languages, of one rhyming couplet from Shakespeare's Othello (1604). Cheesman is quoted as saying, "This one couplet is a great challenge for translators, because of its ambiguity, its punning wordplay and its controversial implications regarding race, gender and political power. Each version expresses a different interpretation, making a fascinating study in re-translation-mutation-adaptation … or 'versioning'. There can be no 'straight translation' of Shakespeare's language. I do believe that a WikiProject could develop this site in magnificent, way!"On the VVV website the project team professionals, students and translators uploaded translations of the following two lines of verse:

If virtue no delighted beauty lack,
Your son-in-law is far more fair than black.

Readers are asked to crowd source these two lines together with a literal translation into English. The project has 150 versions in 22 languages and ultimately hopes to gather more than 300 versions in over 100 languages, thus creating a global snapshot of when, where and how Othello recompiled.

 Bibliography 
 (ed.) Are You Happy With That? By People Seeking Sanctuary (Swansea: Hafan Books, 2013), 199pp.
 (trans.), Ulrike Draesner, William Shakespeare, Olive Ond: Thymine (Boiled String Poetry Chapbooks) (Swansea: Hafan Books, 2013), 
 (trans.), : flower angel ship (Boiled String Poetry Chapbooks) (Swansea: Hafan Books, 2013), 
 (ed.) German Text Crimes: Writers Accused, from the 1950s to the 2000s (German Monitor) (Amsterdam and New York: Editions Rodopi B.V., 2013), 254pp
 (ed. with ), Feridun Zaimoglu (Contemporary German Writers & Filmmakers) (Oxford etc.: Peter Lang, 2012), 285pp
 (trans. with John Goodby), Soleïman Adel Guémar: State of Emergency (Visible Poets) (Todmorden:  Arc Publications, 2007), 162pp
 Novels of Turkish German Settlement: Cosmopolite Fictions (Rochester, NY: Camden House, 2007), x + 232 pp. 
 The Shocking Ballad Picture Show: German Popular Literature and Cultural History, Oxford/Providence: Berg, 1994, xxxv + 240 pp. 
 (ed. with Grahame Davies and Sylvie Hoffmann), Gwyl y Blaidd. Ysgrifennu Ffoaduriaid yng Nghymru / The Festival of the Wolf. Writing Refugees in Wales 4 (Swansea: Hafan Books / Cardigan: Parthian Books, 2006), vi + 210 pp. 
 (ed. with Eric Ngalle Charles and Sylvie Hoffmann), Soft Touch: Refugees Writing in Wales 3 (Swansea: Hafan Books, 2005), 128 pp. 
 (ed. with Eric Ngalle Charles and Sylvie Hoffmann), Nobody's Perfect: Refugees Writing in Wales 2 (Swansea: Hafan Books, 2004), 96 pp. 
 (ed. with Eric Ngalle Charles and Sylvie Hoffmann), Between a Mountain and a Sea: Refugees Writing in Wales (Swansea: Hafan Books, 2003), 96 pp. 
 (ed. with Karin E. Yesilada),  (Contemporary German Writers series), Cardiff: University of Wales Press, 2003,  / , xi + 187 pp. 
 (ed. with Sigrid Rieuwerts), Ballads into Books: The Legacies of Francis James Child, Berne: Peter Lang, 1997, 283 pp.; 2nd rev. edn 1999,  .
 (ed.) Recent Ballad Research: The Language of Ballads and Other Topics''. Proceedings of the 19th SIEF Ballad Commission Conference (Freiburg i.Br. 1989), 2 vols, London: Folklore Society (Library Pamphlets 4/5) 1990, / .

References 

Living people
1961 births
English literary critics
Academics of Swansea University